May Bank is a suburb of Newcastle-under-Lyme in Staffordshire, England.

The leader of Newcastle Borough Council Simon Tagg is a May Bank ward councillor.

Newcastle-under-Lyme